Balázs Horváth (13 August 1942, Budapest – 2 July 2006) was an Interior minister of Hungary. He was a member of the Hungarian Democratic Forum.

He was a lawyer, a graduate of the Faculty of Law of the Eötvös Loránd University in Budapest. In 1988,

he was among the founders of the Hungarian Democratic Forum, in 1990 for several months served as interior minister in the government of József Antall. Later he left the Hungarian Democratic Forum, for a time was an independent MP, in 2004, he founded the National Forum with several representatives, which entered into a coalition with Fidesz block. On behalf of the Fidesz won a parliamentary mandate in April 2006, but died two months later. His nephew, Zsolt Horváth succeeded him in that position.

External links 
 Nol.hu (In Hungarian)
 MNO.hu (In Hungarian)

References 

1942 births
2006 deaths
Politicians from Budapest
Hungarian Democratic Forum politicians
Hungarian Interior Ministers
Members of the National Assembly of Hungary (1990–1994)
Members of the National Assembly of Hungary (1998–2002)
Members of the National Assembly of Hungary (2002–2006)
Members of the National Assembly of Hungary (2006–2010)